Adrian Charter Township is a charter township of Lenawee County in the U.S. state of Michigan. As of the 2020 census, the township population was 6,401. The city of Adrian borders on the south, but the two are administered autonomously.

History
The present boundaries of Adrian township correspond to survey township 6 South Range 3 East. Lenawee County was initially divided into three townships by act of the Michigan Territorial Council on April 12, 1827. Tecumseh Township spanned the northern portion of the county, Logan Township spanned the middle tier and Blissfield Township spanned the southern tier (and also included an area in the "Toledo Strip" which ultimately became part of Ohio).

Over time, new townships were created and the area of Logan Township was reduced. By an act of the Territorial Legislature on March 7, 1834, Logan Township was reduced to consist of T6S R3E and was renamed as "Adrian Township", to match that of Adrian, the main village in the township. The village of Adrian was platted under the name "Logan" in 1828 by Addison J. Comstock, but was soon renamed "Adrian" after the Roman Emperor Hadrian at the request of Comstock's wife.

Communities
Birdsall was a community in Adrian Township. It was founded by Darius Comstock, a brother of Addison Comstock, the founder of Adrian. Darius Comstock settled here in 1827. In 1831, he gave land to the Quakers to found a meetinghouse. In 1850, a Quaker school was founded here, which operated until 1908. There was a post office here from 1897 until 1901.

Geography

Demographics
As of the census of 2000, there were 5,749 people, 2,147 households, and 1,711 families residing in the township. The racial makeup of the township was 92.68% White, 1.65% African American, 0.45% Native American, 0.80% Asian, 2.94% from other races, and 1.48% from two or more races. Hispanic or Latino of any race were 5.97% of the population.

There were 2,147 households, of which 32.9% had children under the age of 18 living with them, 70.7% were married couples living together, 6.9% had a female householder with no husband present, and 20.3% were non-families. 16.8% of all households were made up of individuals, and 8.1% had someone living alone who was 65 years of age or older. The average household size was 2.67 and the average family size was 2.99.

In the township the population was spread out, with 24.9% under the age of 18, 6.8% from 18 to 24, 26.1% from 25 to 44, 29.4% from 45 to 64, and 12.8% who were 65 years of age or older. The median age was 40 years. For every 100 females, there were 97.6 males. For every 100 females age 18 and over, there were 96.4 males.

The median income for a household in the township was $60,640, and the median income for a family was $64,653. Males had a median income of $46,106 versus $28,558 for females. The total per capita income for the township was $24,881. About 1.4% of families and 3.2% of the population were below the poverty line, including 2.2% of those under age 18 and 3.3% of those aged 65 or over.

References

External links
Lenawee County government site
Complete text of History of Lenawee County published in 1909 by the Western Historical Society

Townships in Lenawee County, Michigan
Charter townships in Michigan
1834 establishments in Michigan Territory
Populated places established in 1834